Zambian Airways was the flag carrier of Zambia, based in Lusaka, Zambia.

Zambian Airways suspended operations on January 10, 2009.

History 
Mines Air Services Limited (MAS) was incorporated in 1948 as a subsidiary of Zambia Consolidated Copper Mines (ZCCM). As part of the process of privatisation of the mines, MAS was disposed of by the government of Zambia on 28 April 1998. MAS purchased two new Raytheon Beech 1900D Airliner aircraft from Raytheon Credit Corporation (RCC) in July and August 1998 respectively. The company has been operating these two aircraft since then, under the trading name of Zambian Airways.

On 10 January 2009, the company announced it was suspending operations citing high fuel costs as the main reason.  Shareholders were not available for comment in order to answer questions about when or if the airline may commence operations again, but according to the Zambian Minister of Communications and Transport, Dora Siliya, 41 passengers had been stranded in Johannesburg as a direct result of the airline suspension of operations. The Zambian government announced on 9 February 2009, that it intended to sue Zambian Airways in order to recover the money the airline owes various firms. Its debt was noted to be US$29 million.

Destinations

Zambian Airways used to serve the following destinations when it operated:
Democratic Republic of the Congo
Lubumbashi (Lubumbashi International Airport)
South Africa
Johannesburg (OR Tambo International Airport)
Tanzania
Dar es Salaam (Julius Nyerere International Airport)
Zambia
Chipata (Chipata Airport)
Livingstone (Livingstone Airport)
Lusaka (Lusaka International Airport) Hub
Mfuwe (Mfuwe Airport)
Ndola (Ndola Airport)
Solwezi (Solwezi Airport)

Fleet

The Zambian Airways fleet consisted of the following aircraft (as of 24 September 2008):

References

External links

Zambian Airways

Defunct airlines of Zambia
Airlines established in 1948
Airlines disestablished in 2009
Companies based in Lusaka
1948 establishments in Northern Rhodesia
2009 disestablishments in Africa
2000s disestablishments in Zambia